The 19th Golden Bell Awards was held on 18 March 1984 at the Sun Yat-sen Memorial Hall in Taipei, Taiwan. The ceremony was broadcast by Taiwan Television (TTV).

Winners

References

1984
1984 in Taiwan